Dominica competed at the 2022 World Athletics Championships in Eugene, United States, from 15 to 24 July 2022.

Results
Dominica entered 2 athletes, one jumper of each gender.

Men 

Field events

Women 

Field events

References

External links
Oregon22｜WCH 22｜World Athletics

Nations at the 2022 World Athletics Championships
World Championships in Athletics
Dominica at the World Championships in Athletics